Hypenagonia is a genus of moths of the family Erebidae first described by George Hampson in 1893. The adult moths have pale brown wings with a dark band across each wing. The wingspan of these moths is about 1 centimeter.

Taxonomy
The genus has previously been classified in the subfamily Hypeninae within either the families Erebidae or Noctuidae.

Description
Palpi of moderate length, where the second joint fringed with scaled above. Third joint minute. Frontal tuft short. Antennae annulate (ringed). Thorax and abdomen smoothly scaled. Tibia hairless. Forewings long and narrow. Outer margin angled at middle. Veins 7 to 9 stalked. Hindwings with highly angled outer margin at middle and excised towards anal angle. Veins 3, 4 and 6, 7 stalked, whereas vein 5 from near lower angle of cell.

Species
Hypenagonia acrocausta (Turner, 1944) Queensland
Hypenagonia angulata Wileman, 1915 Formosa
Hypenagonia anna Robinson, 1975 Fiji
Hypenagonia barbara Robinson, 1975 Fiji
Hypenagonia bipuncta Wileman, 1915 Formosa
Hypenagonia brachypalpia Hampson, 1912 Sri Lanka, Borneo
Hypenagonia brunnea Bethune-Baker, 1908 New Guinea
Hypenagonia catherina Robinson, 1975 Fiji
Hypenagonia diana Robinson, 1975 Fiji
Hypenagonia dohertyi Holloway, 2008 Pulo Laut in Borneo
Hypenagonia emma Robinson, 1975 Fiji
Hypenagonia flavisigna Hampson, 1912 Sri Lanka
Hypenagonia hefferi Holloway, 2008 Borneo
Hypenagonia henseli Holloway, 2008 Borneo
Hypenagonia leucosticta Hampson, 1895 Bhuta
Hypenagonia longipalpis Hampson, 1912 Sri Lanka, India, Borneo
Hypenagonia mediifascia Wileman & South, 1917 Formosa
Hypenagonia melalepidia (Hampson, 1926) New Guinea
Hypenagonia mesoscia (Turner, 1933) Queensland
Hypenagonia minor Wileman, 1915 Formosa
Hypenagonia nigrifascia Hampson, 1893 Sri Lanka
Hypenagonia normata Joannis, 1929 Vietnam
Hypenagonia obliquifascia Wileman & South, 1917 Formosa
Hypenagonia pallifurca Holloway, 2008 Borneo
Hypenagonia rosacea (Bethune-Baker, 1908) New Guinea
Hypenagonia subsuffusata Wileman & West, 1930 Formosa
Hypenagonia vexataria (Walker, 1861) Borneo
Hypenagonia vexatariola (Strand, 1920) Formosa

References

Boletobiinae
Noctuoidea genera